Awi/Pori Rural LLG a local-level government (LLG) of Koroba-Kopiago District in Hela Province, Papua New Guinea.

Wards
01. Ti'iba
02. Tapayamapu
03. Kuranda 2
04. Kuranda 1
05. Tade 2 (Wagia)
06. Tade 1
07. Wagala
08. Eganda
09. Ayuguali 1
10. Ayugali 2
11. Wanga Pareya
12. Tugu
13. Hamuta
14. Puyena
15. Kewe 1
16. Kewe 2
17. Embe
18. Wanga
19. Paga
20. Hawinda 1
21. Hirubala
22. Hawinda 2
23. Kutage
24. Waluni/Tarane
25. Hirutege

References 

Local-level governments of Hela Province